Kathryn Paige Harden is an American psychologist and behavior geneticist. She is Professor of Psychology at the University of Texas at Austin, where she is also the leader of the Developmental Behavior Genetics lab and the co-director of the Texas Twin Project. She is also a Faculty Research Associate at the University of Texas at Austin's Population Research Center and a Jacobs Foundation research fellow.

Early life and education 

Harden and her younger brother Micah grew up in a conservative environment in an exurb of Memphis, Tennessee. Her paternal grandparents were Pentecostalists who worked as farmers and pipeline workers in Texas. Her father was a pilot in the U.S. Navy who later flew planes for FedEx.

She received a full scholarship to Furman University, a formerly Baptist college in South Carolina, where she worked in a lab on rodent genetics research. She graduated with a B.S. in psychology magna cum laude and was in Phi Beta Kappa. She earned her M.A. and Ph.D. in clinical psychology from the University of Virginia in 2005 and 2009 respectively. Her doctoral advisor was Eric Turkheimer.

Research 

Harden's research has focused on using genetic data to understand individual differences in child and adolescent development. She has published papers on the psychological consequences of early puberty and early age at first sexual intercourse, on delinquency and antisocial behavior, and on intelligence and academic achievement.

She was a recipient of the American Psychological Association's Award for Distinguished Scientific Early Career Contributions to Psychology in 2017, in honor of her research on "how to integrate genetic knowledge with the classical clinical and developmental insights into human behavior".

In a 2018 editorial in the New York Times, Harden argued that genetic research on human individual differences is compatible with progressive and egalitarian social goals. In September 2021, Harden published a book on the same concept, The Genetic Lottery: Why DNA Matters for Social Equality, which summarized the history and modern forefront of genetic research and argued that "the science of genetics can help create a more just and equal society".

References

External links

Faculty page 

Living people
American women psychologists
21st-century American psychologists
University of Texas at Austin faculty
Furman University alumni
University of Virginia alumni
Behavior geneticists
American women geneticists
American geneticists
Year of birth missing (living people)
American women academics
21st-century American women